The Western European marriage pattern is a family and demographic pattern that is marked by comparatively late marriage (in the middle twenties), especially for women, with a generally small age difference between the spouses, a significant proportion of women who remain unmarried, and the establishment of a neolocal household after the couple has married. 
In 1965, John Hajnal posited that Europe could be divided into two areas characterized by a different patterns of nuptiality. To the west of the line, marriage rates and thus fertility were comparatively low and a significant minority of women married late or remained single and most families were nuclear; to the east of the line and in the Mediterranean and particular regions of Northwestern Europe, early marriage and extended family homes were the norm and high fertility was countered by high mortality.

Overview
The shift toward this “Western European Marriage Pattern” does not have a clear beginning, but it certainly had become established by the end of the sixteenth century on most of the shores of the North Sea. A marriage pattern where couples married comparatively late in life (and especially late for the bride), on average in the middle twenties after and setting up a nuclear household, all of this preceded by time working as servants or apprentices. Also, a significant proportion of women married after their twenties and 10–20% of women never married. Female age at marriage has proven to be a strong indicator for female autonomy and is used frequently by economic history research.

Effects
The pattern of late and non-universal marriage restricted fertility massively, especially when it was coupled with very low levels of childbirth out of wedlock. Birth control took place by delaying marriage more than suppressing fertility within it. A woman's life-phase from menarche (which was generally reached on average at 14 years, with some women reaching it earlier) to the birth of her first child was unusually long, averaging ten years.

Compared to other cultures
This marriage pattern varied across time and space and class; noblewomen certainly married early, but they were a small minority. The comparatively late age at marriage for women and the small age gap between spouses is rather unusual; women married as adults rather than as dependents, often worked before marriage and brought some skills into the marriage, were less likely to be exhausted by constant pregnancy, and were about the same age as their husbands 

To the west of the Hajnal line, about half of all women aged 15 to 50 years of age were married at any given time while the other half were widows or spinsters; to the east of the line, about seventy percent of women in that age bracket were married at any given time while the other thirty percent were widows or nuns. The marriage records of Western and Eastern Europe in the early 20th century illustrate this pattern vividly; west of the Hajnal line, only 25% of women aged 20–24 were married while to the east of the line, over 75% of women in this age group were married and less than five percent of women remained unmarried. Outside of Europe, women could be married even earlier and even fewer would remain celibate; in Korea, practically every woman 50 years of age had been married and spinsters were extremely rare, compared to 10–25% of women in western Europe age 50 who had never married.

Variation within Western Europe
Where in the mid-1500s in England, approximately 8 percent of women remained unmarried the inference would be that that figure was either the same or lower in the previous several centuries; marriage in Medieval England appears to be a robust institution where over 90% of women married and roughly 70% of women aged 15 to 50 years were married at any given time while the other 30% were single or widows. In Yorkshire in the 14th and 15th centuries, the age range for most brides was between 18 and 22 years and the age of the grooms was similar; rural Yorkshire women tended to marry in their late teens to early twenties while their urban counterparts married in their early to middle twenties. In the 15th century, the average Italian bride was 18 and married a groom 10–12 years her senior. An unmarried Tuscan woman 21 years of age would be seen as past marriageable age, the benchmark for which was 19 years, and easily 97 percent of Florentine women were married by the age of 25 years while 21 years was the average age of a contemporary English bride.

While the average age at first marriage had climbed to 25 years for women and 27 years for men in England and the Low Countries by the end of the 16th century, and the percentage of unmarried Englishwomen rose from less than 10% to nearly 20% by the mid-17th century and their average age at first marriage rose to 26 years at the same time, there was nonetheless great variation within Britain alone; while Lowland Scotland saw patterns similar to England, with women married in the middle twenties after a period of domestic service, the high birth rate of Highland Scotland and the Hebrides imply a lower age of marriage for the bride, possibly similar to Gaelic Ireland, where Brehon Law stated that women became legally marriageable at 15 years and men at 18 years. Similarly, between 1620 and 1690 the average age of first marriage for Swedish women was roughly 20 years, approximately 70% of Swedish women aged between 15 and 50 years were married at any one time, and the proportion of single women was less than 10%, but by the end of the 18th century it had risen to roughly 27 years and remained high with the celibacy rate as a result of falling infant mortality rates, declining famines, decreasing available land and resources for a growing population, and other factors. Similarly, Ireland's average age of marriage in 1830 was 23.8 for women and 27.47 for men where they had once been about 21 and 25, respectively, and only about 10% of adults remained unmarried; in 1840, they had respectively risen to 24.4 and 27.7; in the decades after the Great Famine, the age of marriage had risen to 28–29 for women and 33 for men and as much as a third of Irishmen and a fourth of Irishwomen never married due to chronic economic problems that discouraged early marriage.

Background

Antiquity
The beginnings of this marriage pattern might be found as early as the time of the Roman Empire. Julius Caesar, writing in the first century B.C, wrote that while the Germanic tribes to the north of the empire were communal with their land, living under the Sippe kinship system, the homesteads were largely separate from each other, unlike the closer proximity in Roman towns. And Tacitus, writing a century and a half later, also observed these many private households among the Germanic tribes, although there was public ownership of pastures and controlled use of the forests.

Anglo-Saxon kinship terms were generally very basic; the same word is used for the titles of nephew and grandson, likewise for the term for granddaughter and niece. Based on this, the nuclear household seems to be the norm. Also, since the Church forbade marrying within a given degree of kinship, the common people were probably further discouraged from keeping elaborate kinship networks; Britain only had so many people and virtually everybody on the island was related to some degree and possibly the distant relations had to be forgotten or nearly all marriages would be within the prohibited degrees.

In any case, while nuclear residences might have been the norm for families, the extended family was undeniably important for the Anglo-Saxons; As with many other Germanic tribes, if a member of a family was wronged or injured in any way, the Kentish Laws outlines the restrictions of feuds and reparations to the victim of the offense; kindreds were to take charge of reparation and they could (with a few exceptions, for example, when the conflict was too close in blood-line) arrange either for vengeance or for the payment of compensation to the kin of the killed. In addition, Anglo-Saxon women, like those of other Germanic tribes, are marked as women from the age of twelve onward, based on archaeological finds, implying that the age of marriage coincided with puberty.

Middle Ages

Christianity and manorialism
The rise of Christianity created more incentives to keep families nuclear; the Church instituted marriage laws and practices that undermined large kinship groups. From as early as the fourth century, the Church discouraged any practice that enlarged the family, like adoption, polygamy, taking concubines, divorce, and remarriage. The Church severely discouraged and prohibited consanguineous marriages, a marriage pattern that has constituted a means to maintain kinship groups (and thus their power) throughout history; Canon law followed civil law until the early ninth century, when the Western Church increased the number of prohibited degrees from four to seven. The church also clipped the ability of parents to retain kinship ties through arranged marriages by forbidding unions in which the bride did not clearly agree to the union. These rules were not necessarily followed unanimously nor did all cultures across Europe evolve toward nuclear families, but by the latter half of the Middle Ages the nuclear household was dominant over most of Northwestern Europe and where in the old indigenous religions, women married between 12 and 15 years of age (coinciding with puberty) and men married in their middle twenties, as Christianity expanded men married increasingly earlier and women married increasingly later

The rise of manorialism in the vacuum left after the Fall of Rome might also have weakened the ties of kinship at the same time that the Church had curtailed the power of clans; as early as the 800s in northern France, families that worked on manors were small, consisting of parents and children and occasionally a grandparent. The Church and State had become allies in erasing the solidarity and thus the political power of the clans; the Church sought to replace traditional religion, whose vehicle was the kin group, and substituting the authority of the elders of the kin group with that of a religious elder, the presbyter. At the same time, the king's rule was undermined by revolts on the part of powerful, communal kin groups, whose conspiracies and murders threatened the power of the state and, once manorialism had become established, also threatened the demand of manorial lords for obedient, compliant workers; in the west, manorialism was unsuccessful in establishing itself in Frisia, Ireland, Scotland, Wales, Cornwall, the East of England, and the south of Iberia and Italy. 

Indeed, Medieval England saw marriage age as variable depending on economic circumstances, with couples delaying marriage until the early twenties when times were bad and the average age falling to the late teens after the Black Death, when there were labor shortages; by appearances, marriage of adolescents was not the norm in England. The sudden loss of people from the plague resulted in a glut of lucrative jobs for many people and more people could afford to marry young, lowering the age at marriage to the late teens and thus increasing fertility.

The beginnings of consensual marriage
About 1140, Gratian established that according to canon law the bonds of marriage should be determined by mutual consent and not consummation, voicing opinions similar to Isaac's opinion of forced marriages; marriages were made by God and the blessing of a priest should only be made after the fact. Therefore, a man and a woman could agree to marry each other at even the minimum age of consent- fourteen years for men, twelve years for women- and bring the priest after the fact. But this doctrine led to the problem of clandestine marriage, performed without witness or connection to public institution. The opinion of the parents was still important, although the final decision was not the decision to be made by the parents, for this new consent by both parties meant that a contract between equals was drawn rather than a coerced consensus.

Patriarchy remained in some form or another, including the necessity of the dowry by young women. To curb secret marriages and remind young couples of parental power, the Medieval Church encouraged prolonged courtship, arrangements and monetary logistics, informing the community of the wedding, and finally the formal exchange of vows. While in the South a woman's dowry was viewed as separate from her husband's wealth, in the Northwest the dowry was "conjugal"; a woman's dowry merged with her husband's wealth and would grow or shrink depending on circumstances and to which she had rights in widowhood, an attractive incentive for women to earn money. And the chance for women to earn money in the one hundred and fifty years after the Black Death was attractive, with less competition for jobs; as much as half of women in the North willingly worked to earn money for marriage while their Southern contemporaries were married or widows before turning to work and unmarried young women only worked as a last resort, lest her honor be put at risk.

Early Modern Europe
The average age at first marriage had gradually risen again by late sixteenth century; the population had stabilized and availability of jobs and land had lessened. In the last decades of the century the age at marriage had climbed to averages of 25 for women and 27 for men in England and the Low Countries as more people married later or remained unmarried due to lack of money or resources and a decline in living standards, and these averages remained high for nearly two centuries and averages across Northwestern Europe had done likewise. Because of its sacramental nature, marriage was increasingly held to be indissoluble, and sexual relations outside of marriage were viewed as illicit. Christian Europe banned polygamy and divorce, and attempted to prohibit any form of sexual relationship that was not marriage, such as concubine or premarital sex, termed fornication. Women were generally expected to bring a dowry when they married, which ranged from a few household goods to a whole province in the case of the high nobility. Remarriage after the death of a spouse was acceptable for both men and women, and very common, though men remarried faster than women. Most issues regarding marriage and many other aspects of family life came under the jurisdiction of church courts and were regulated by an increasingly elaborate legal system termed canon law. The ideals for marriage were not followed in many instances: powerful individuals could often persuade church courts to grant annulments of marriages they needed to end; men, including priests and other church leaders, had concubines and mistresses; young people had sex before marriage and were forced into marriages that they did not want. Nevertheless, these ideals and the institutions established to enforce them remained important shapers of men's and women's understanding of and place within a family.

When a growing population of poverty caused by “over-hasting marriages and over-soon setting up of households by the youth”., the decree of the Common Council of London in 1556 raised the age of consent to twenty-one. This aligned with the contemporary views that condemned those who had no means to establish and maintain their own household. The Act of 1901, also contributed to an increase in the average age of first marriage. It allowed overseers to apprentice children of the parish poor from the age of ten to twenty-four, essentially delaying the prospects of marriage.

So many Englishmen began migrating en masse to North America that the marriage prospects for unmarried Englishwomen dwindled and the average age of first marriage rose for Englishwomen. In addition, there was a sharp rise in the percentage of women who remained unmarried and thus decreased fertility; an Englishwoman marrying at the average age of 26 years in the late 17th century who survived her childbearing years would bear an average of 5.03 children while an Englishwoman making a comparable marriage in the early 19th century at the average age of 23.5 years and surviving her childbearing years would bear on average 6.02 children, an increase of about 20 percent.

From 1619 to 1660 in the archdiocese of Canterbury, England, the median age of the brides was 22 years and nine months while the median age for the grooms was 25 years and six months, with average ages of 24 years for the brides and nearly 28 years for the grooms, with the most common ages at marriage being 22 years for women and 24 years for men; the Church dictated that the age when one could marry without the consent of one's parents was 21 years. A large majority of English brides in this time were at least 19 years of age when they married, and only one bride in a thousand was thirteen years of age or younger.

William Shakespeare's drama Romeo and Juliet  puts Juliet's age at just short of fourteen years; the idea of a woman marrying in secret at a very early age would have scandalized Elizabethans. The common belief in Elizabethan England was that motherhood before 16 was dangerous; popular manuals of health, as well as observations of married life, led Elizabethans to believe that early marriage and its consummation permanently damaged a young woman's health, impaired a young man's physical and mental development, and produced sickly or stunted children. Therefore, 18 came to be considered the earliest reasonable age for motherhood and 20 and 30 the ideal ages for women and men, respectively, to marry. Shakespeare might also have reduced Juliet's age from sixteen to fourteen to demonstrate the dangers of marriage at too young of an age; that Shakespeare himself married Anne Hathaway when he was just eighteen (very unusual for an Englishman of the time) might hold some significance.

See also
 Demographic transition
 Hajnal line
 Marriage
 Medieval singlewomen
 Nuclear family
 Extended family
 Kinship

References

Demographic maps
Demographics of Europe
Marriage in Europe
Kinship and descent